Black Waltz is the fourth album by Swedish melodic death metal band Avatar, released on 25 January 2012. (In the US, it was released on 14 February 2012.)

During the making of the "Black Waltz" music video, the band asked their makeup artist to come with something to make frontman Johannes Eckerström fit in with the characters, and she responded with the "Clown" face paint, which Eckerström is also seen wearing on the album cover. Eckerström has said, "... Something clicked... seeing that face, it awakened something that really wasn't there before; or was but was well hidden... Suddenly the music got its face." He now regularly wears the face paint in music videos and band photo shoots, as well as during live shows.

In a French book collecting artists' speech about the Hellfest Open Air festival, Eckerström declared that "Black Waltz" almost was the band's last album, frustrated that they couldn't find their own way. The singer says "we decided to do a last effort, some sort of statement, to tell the world we were here, that we existed. As we were not awaiting anything from our career, we decided, for the first time, to make the album that represented us. We learned to write for ourselves, without caring about the opinion of anyone else. And this formula worked!" 

The album reached position 25 on the album list in Avatar's native Sweden.

Track listing

Personnel

Avatar 
Johannes Eckerström – lead vocals
Jonas "Kungen" Jarlsby – guitar
Tim Öhrström – guitar, backing vocals
Henrik Sandelin – bass, backing vocals
John Alfredsson – drums

Charts

References 

2012 albums
Avatar (Swedish band) albums